Edwin Clark University(ECU) is a privately owned university located in Kiagbodo, Delta State, Nigeria. It was approved by the Federal Executive Council of Nigeria in 2015.

History 
Chief Edwin K. Clark is the founder of Edwin Clark University. The institution was established in May 2015.It was previously known as Edwin Clark University of Technology (ECUT) but was later changed.

Administration 
The principal officers of the institution , are:

Programmes 
The National Universities Commission, NUC, in 2018, after rigorous accreditation, approved the university to run 18 programmes at the institution.

Faculties 

Faculty of Science

Departments:
 Biochemistry
 Biology
 Microbiology
 Computer Science
 Mathematics
 Industrial Chemistry
 Chemistry
 Physics

Faculty of Humanities, Social and Management Sciences
 Accounting
 Banking and Finance
 Business Administration
 Economics
 English & Literary Studies
 Geography
 History & International Studies
 Mass Communication
 Political Science
 Sociology

Faculty of Agricultural Sciences

Agric with options in:
 Animal Science
 Crop Science
 Soil Science
 Agricultural Economics and Extension
 Aquaculture & Fisheries
 Forestry & Wildlife
 Hotel Management &Tourism

Faculty of Law
 LL.B Law

Offices and units 
 Vice Chancellor's Office
 Registry
 Bursary
 Librarian's Office

References 

2015 establishments in Nigeria
Universities and colleges in Nigeria